Daula Singh was an Indian professional wrestler who wrestled worldwide between the 1930s and the 1960s. He is known for having an impressive undefeated streak.

Professional wrestling career
He competed with wrestlers like Ed Lewis, Bob Kruse, Paul Boesch, Billy Meeske, Sandor Szabo, Tom Lurich, Mayes McLain and Bill Verna etc. On 28 October 1938 he defeated Canadian champion Whipper Billy Watson at Junction Stadium, Manchester.

Championships and accomplishments
Champion of India

References

External links
Tiger Daula at wrestlingdata.com 

Indian male professional wrestlers
Punjabi people
Year of death uncertain
Year of birth uncertain
Year of death missing